The ITV Opale (Opal) is a French single-place, paraglider that was designed by Xavier Demoury and produced by ITV Parapentes of Épagny, Haute-Savoie. It is now out of production.

Design and development
The Opale was designed as a beginner glider. The models are each named for their approximate wing area in square metres.

Variants
Opale 24
Small-sized model for lighter pilots. The glider model is CEN Standard certified.
Opale 27
Mid-sized model for medium-weight pilots. The glider model is CEN Standard certified.
Opale 30
Large-sized model for heavier pilots. The glider model is CEN Standard certified.

Specifications (Opale 27)

References

Opale
Paragliders